Steamin' with the Miles Davis Quintet is a studio album by the Miles Davis quintet, recorded in 1956 but not released until July or August 1961. Two sessions on May 11, 1956 and October 26 in the same year resulted in an additional three albums:  Relaxin' with The Miles Davis Quintet, Workin' with The Miles Davis Quintet and Cookin' with the Miles Davis Quintet.

Reception
The contemporaneous DownBeat reviewer praised all of the musicians except Garland, and concluded: "This album is a must for anyone seriously interested in jazz".

Track listing
Prestige – LP 7200:

Personnel
Miles Davis – trumpet
John Coltrane – tenor saxophone (except 3 and 6)
Red Garland – piano
Paul Chambers – bass
Philly Joe Jones – drums

References

1961 albums
Miles Davis albums
Prestige Records albums
Albums produced by Bob Weinstock
Albums recorded at Van Gelder Studio